The Grand Falls Rapids are a Canadian junior ice hockey team based in Grand Falls, New Brunswick.  They are in the Maritime Junior Hockey League's Eastlink North Division along with five other Maritime clubs. The Rapids play their home games at the Centre E. & P. Senechal.

History
In 2003, the junior 'B' Woodstock Slammers jumped to junior 'A' to become part of the Maritime Junior A Hockey League. After a rough first three years in Woodstock, the Slammers eventually won three MHL championships, a Fred Page Cup, and were the runners-up in the 2012 Royal Bank Cup. In 2018, after multiple losing seasons, the Woodstock Slammers organization applied for a one year leave of absence. Later in 2018, it was announced that the franchise would relocate to Grand Falls, New Brunswick, under a new ownership group. On June 6, 2018, their new name, the Grand Falls Rapids, was revealed.

Season by Season record

See also
List of ice hockey teams in New Brunswick
Canadian Junior Hockey League

References

External links
 Maritime Junior Hockey League 
 Canadian Junior Hockey League 

Maritime Junior Hockey League teams
Ice hockey teams in New Brunswick
Grand Falls, New Brunswick
2018 establishments in New Brunswick
Ice hockey clubs established in 2018